Martin Disteli (28 May 1802 in Olten – 18 March 1844 in Solothurn) was a Swiss painter.

Early years
He attended college in Solothurn 1817, then went to study in Lucerne from 1819 to 1821 (where he attended the very liberal zofingien circle). He also studied literature in Freiburg im Breisgau and in Jena in 1821. In 1823, he was forced to suddenly return home to Switzerland when he was accused of slander, having publicly denouncing Goethe's absence of political affiliation.

Style and influence 
Disteli was the main figure of Swiss political imagery shortly before 1848. His caricatures bring together the French and German graphical traditions.

References
This article was initially translated from the German Wikipedia.

19th-century Swiss painters
Swiss male painters
1802 births
1844 deaths
19th-century Swiss male artists